Calvin Jefford (born 16 February 1987) is a Caymanian footballer who plays as a forward. He has represented the Cayman Islands during World Cup qualifying match in 2008.

References

Association football forwards
Living people
1987 births
Caymanian footballers
Cayman Islands international footballers
Elite SC players